Harpalus modestus is a species of black coloured ground beetle that can be found in such European countries as Andorra, Austria, Baltic states, Benelux, Bulgaria, Czech Republic, France, Germany, Hungary, Italy, Moldova, Poland, Slovakia, Switzerland, Ukraine, all states of former Yugoslavia (except for North Macedonia), and central part of Russia. Its existence in Spain and on Alboran island is doubtful. It can also be found in Japan, North and South Korea, and Chinese provinces such as Heilongjiang, Liaoning, Qinghai, Shanxi, and Sichuan.

References

External links
Harpalus modestus on Carabidae of Romania

modestus
Beetles of Europe
Beetles described in 1829